Willie Hortencio Barbosa (born 15 May 1993), commonly known as Willie, is a Brazilian footballer who plays as a winger for Liga I club UTA Arad.

Honours

Vitória
 Campeonato Baiano: 2013

Apollon Smyrnis
 Football League: 2016–17

Ceará
 Campeonato Cearense runner-up: 2017

References

External links
Willie at playmakerstats.com (English version of ogol.com.br)

1993 births
Living people
Brazilian footballers
Brazilian expatriate footballers
Campeonato Brasileiro Série A players
Campeonato Brasileiro Série B players
Liga I players
Swiss Challenge League players
Football League (Greece) players
Bolivian Primera División players
Israeli Premier League players
Esporte Clube Vitória players
CR Vasco da Gama players
FC Botoșani players
Apollon Smyrnis F.C. players
Servette FC players
Ceará Sporting Club players
Clube de Regatas Brasil players
The Strongest players
Hapoel Ironi Kiryat Shmona F.C. players
C.D. Jorge Wilstermann players
FC UTA Arad players
Association football forwards
Sportspeople from Bahia
Brazilian expatriate sportspeople in Romania
Brazilian expatriate sportspeople in Greece
Brazilian expatriate sportspeople in Switzerland
Brazilian expatriate sportspeople in Bolivia
Brazilian expatriate sportspeople in Israel
Expatriate footballers in Romania
Expatriate footballers in Greece
Expatriate footballers in Switzerland
Expatriate footballers in Bolivia
Expatriate footballers in Israel